Mario Feliciani (12 March 1918 – 11 August 2008) was an Italian actor and voice actor.

Life and career 
Born in Milan, after completing his classical education Feliciani attended the Accademia dei filodrammatici obtaining the diploma. He made his stage debut in 1941, with the theatrical company "Palcoscenico". Later he was part of various companies, obtaining his first personal successes in 1946, with the drama La luna è tramontata.

From 1947 to 1952 he was a member of the Piccolo Teatro's stage company directed by Giorgio Strehler. He had also a very long and important collaboration on stage with Vittorio Gassman, also performing tours abroad with him. In the 1970s he came back to Piccolo Teatro for two important works, Santa Giovanna dei macelli (1970–71) and Le case del vedovo (1975-76).

Feliciani was also very active in films, on television and as a voice actor, on the radio and in the dubbing.

Married to the actress Giuliana Pogliani, after obtaining the annulment Feliciani was married to actress Vittoria Martello.

Partial filmography

 Paese senza pace (1946) - Conocchia
 Sardinian Vendetta (1952) - Zio Porchiddu
 Five Paupers in an Automobile (1952) - Il parrucchiere
 La figlia del diavolo (1952) - Domenico
 Brothers of Italy (1952) - Cesare Battisti
 We Two Alone (1952) - Cairolas' Father
 Puccini (1953) - Enrico
 Captain Phantom (1953)
 Ivan (il figlio del diavolo bianco) (1953)
 Ulysses (1954) - Eurimaco
 Attila (1954) - Ippolito
 Big Deal on Madonna Street (1958) - Ispettore di polizia (uncredited)
 The Great War (1959) - (uncredited)
 Audace colpo dei soliti ignoti (1959) - Police inspector
 Everybody Go Home (1960) - Capitano Passerini
 The Last of the Vikings (1961) - Simon
 Maciste Vs. the Vampire (1961) - Sultan Abdul / Omar
 Rage of the Buccaneers (1961) - The Governor
 The Italian Brigands (1961) - Don Ramiro
 The Corsican Brothers (1961) - Dr. Dupont
 Dreams Die at Dawn (1961) - Mario
 La monaca di Monza (1962) - Don Martino de Leyva
 The Golden Arrow (1962) - Baktiar
 Shades of Zorro (1962) - McDonald
 The Sign of the Coyote (1963) - Governor Parker
Son of the Circus (1963) - Ministero Pubblico
 Devil of the Desert Against the Son of Hercules (1964) - Ganor, Devil of the Desert
 Revolt of the Barbarians (1964)
 100 Horsemen (1964) - Sheik Aben Calbon
 Three Swords for Rome (1964)
 Fire Over Rome (1965)
 Assassination in Rome (1965)
 Casanova 70 (1965) - Il procuratore
 Lady L (1965) - L'anarchiste italien
 El Greco (1966) - Nino de Guevara
 Maigret a Pigalle (1966) - Il direttore della polizia giudiziaria
 The Cold Killer (1966)
 Rose rosse per Angelica (1968) - Dr. Durand
 The Christmas Tree (1969) - Le docteur
 Many Wars Ago (1970) - Colonello medici
 Gang War (1971) - Calogero Bertuccione
 Roma Bene (1971) - Teo Teopoulos
 Pianeta Venere (1972)
 The Silkworm (1973) - Avv. Planget
 Convoy Busters (1978) - Prosecutor
 Lion of the Desert (1980) - Lobitto
 Pierino medico della Saub (1981) - Dottor Tambroni
 Forest of Love (1981)
 Amici miei – Atto III (1985) - Generale Mastrostefano

References

External links 

 

1918 births
2008 deaths
Male actors from Milan
Italian male stage actors
Italian male film actors
Italian male television actors
Italian male voice actors
20th-century Italian male actors